Chunk head may refer to:

 Agkistrodon contortrix, a.k.a. the copperhead, a venomous pitviper found in North America
 Heterodon platirhinos, a.k.a. the eastern hog-nosed snake, a harmless colubrid found in North America